Huntington Line may refer to:
Blue Line (Washington Metro), the original planned designation of the line terminating at Huntington, Virginia, and has operated trains to Huntington at various times since
Yellow Line (Washington Metro), whose southern terminus is Huntington, Virginia
Port Jefferson Branch, on the Long Island Railroad, with many trains calling at Huntington